The following is a list of events affecting Philippine television in 1984. Events listed include television show debuts, finales, cancellations, and channel launches, closures and rebrandings, as well as information about controversies and carriage disputes.

Events 
 May 14: Philippine TV channels broadcast non-stop coverage of the 1984 Philippine parliamentary election.

Premieres

Unknown
 Business Talks on MBS 4
 Daigdig ng mga Artista sa Telebisyon on GMA
 Hotel on GMA
 Miami Vice on GMA
 Murder, She Wrote on GMA
 Who's the Boss on GMA
 La Aunor on RPN
 Nora Cinderella on RPN

Programs transferring networks

Finales

Unknown
 Take Two for the Road on MBS 4
 Cafeteria Aroma on GMA
 Geebees' Sine-TV Balita on GMA
 Mork & Mindy on GMA
 That's Incredible on GMA
 Gulong ng Buhay on RPN
 Helpline sa 9 on RPN
 Tambakan Alley, Etc. on RPN
 This is It! on IBC 13
 Sesame! on RPN

Births
 January 12 - Oyo Boy Sotto, actor
 January 20 – Toni Gonzaga, singer, television host and actress
 January 21 – Richard Gutierrez, actor and commercial model and his twin brother Raymond Gutierrez, actor and television host
 March 10 - Paolo Contis, actor and comedian
 March 11 - Bernard Cardona, television host and actor
 March 28 - Joseph Bitangcol, actor and dancer
 May 23 – Sam Milby, Filipino-American actor, commercial model, and recording artist
 June 6 - Angela Lagunzad, journalist, TV host
 July 16 – Ginger Conejero, TV reporter and host
 July 19 – Alessandra De Rossi, actress
 July 24 -
 Pia Gutierrez, news reporter
 Boy 2 Quizon, comedian and actor
 August 10 – Mariel Rodriguez, commercial model, television host and actress
 August 12 – Marian Rivera, commercial model and actress
 August 24 - Teresa Garcia, Broadcaster, TV Personality
 September 22 - Marcelito Pomoy, singer
 November 13 - Dimples Romana, actress.

 November 28 – Joross Gamboa, actor
 November 29 – Sitti Navarro, bossa nova singer
 December 8 – Hero Angeles, actor
 December 10 – Krista Ranillo, actress
 December 20 – Liezel Garcia, singer-songwriter and actress
 December 30 – Rico Barrera

Deaths
 February 10 - Claudia Zobel, actress
 February 17 - Ading Fernando

See also
1984 in television

References

 
Television in the Philippines by year
Philippine television-related lists